The Battle of the Amazons or Amazonomachia is an oil on wood painting produced around 1615. It shows an amazonomachy. It is usually attributed to Rubens, showing his huge admiration for Leonardo da Vinci and his The Battle of Anghiari, though the biographer Giovanni Pietro Bellori has attributed it to Anthony van Dyck. It is now in the Alte Pinakothek in Munich.

This painting was formerly in the collection of Cornelis van der Geest and can be seen in two paintings of his art gallery in the 1630s by Willem van Haecht.

Notes

1615 paintings
Paintings by Peter Paul Rubens
Collection of the Alte Pinakothek
War paintings
Horses in art
Water in art